The third Langerado Music Festival was held on March 12 and March 13, 2005.  This marked the first year of Langerado as a multi-day event and the debut of the festival at Markham Park in Sunrise, FL. Over 10,000 festival patrons attended the show in 2005.  The 2005 Langerado was also the first time the event had multiple aftershows at various venues in the area, forming what came to be known as "Late-Night Langerado."

Lineup
The artists that attended the festival included The String Cheese Incident, Medeski Martin & Wood, Toots & the Maytals, Keller Williams, Karl Denson's Tiny Universe, Michael Franti & Spearhead, De La Soul, Umphrey's McGee, MOFRO, Particle, the Dirty Dozen Brass Band, Soulive, Antibalas Afrobeat Orchestra, the New Deal, Robert Walter's 20th Congress, New Monsoon, Donavon Frankenreiter, the Benevento/Russo Duo, Kaki King, the Spam Allstars, the Hackensaw Boys, deSol, DJ Williams Projekt, Pencilgrass and the Wrinkle Neck Mules.

Langerado
Langerado Music Festival
2005 in American music
2005 music festivals
Langerado